Mickevičius or Mickiewicz is a Lithuanian (Mickevičius), Belarusian (Міцкевіч),  and Polish (Mickiewicz) family name.

The surname may refer to:

 Adam Mickiewicz (1799–1855) - world-renowned poet
 Vincas Krėvė-Mickevičius (1882–1954), writer
 Vincas Mickevičius-Kapsukas (1880–1935), communist activist
 Konstancija Mickevičiūtė - mother of Algirdas Julien Greimas
 Yakub Kolas (real name Kanstancin Mickievič) - Belarusian writer

Lithuanian-language surnames